Alimgulovo (Älimğol) is a rural locality (a village) in Volostnovsky Selsoviet, Kugarchinsky District, Bashkortostan, Russia. The population was 103 as of 2010. There are 2 streets.

Geography 
Alimgulovo is located 35 km west of Mrakovo (the district's administrative centre) by road. Tyulyabayevo is the nearest rural locality.

References 

Rural localities in Kugarchinsky District